The canton of Coteau de Chalosse is an administrative division of the Landes department, southwestern France. It was created at the French canton reorganisation which came into effect in March 2015. Its seat is in Montfort-en-Chalosse.

It consists of the following communes:
 
Amou
Argelos
Arsague
Baigts
Bassercles
Bastennes
Bergouey
Beyries
Bonnegarde
Brassempouy
Cassen
Castaignos-Souslens
Castelnau-Chalosse
Castel-Sarrazin
Caupenne
Clermont
Doazit
Donzacq
Gamarde-les-Bains
Garrey
Gaujacq
Gibret
Goos
Gousse
Hauriet
Hinx
Lahosse
Larbey
Laurède
Louer
Lourquen
Marpaps
Maylis
Montfort-en-Chalosse
Mugron
Nassiet
Nerbis
Nousse
Onard
Ozourt
Pomarez
Poyanne
Poyartin
Préchacq-les-Bains
Saint-Aubin
Saint-Geours-d'Auribat
Saint-Jean-de-Lier
Sort-en-Chalosse
Toulouzette
Vicq-d'Auribat

References

Cantons of Landes (department)